QCode (sometimes stylized as QCODE) is a podcast network and audio production studio based in Los Angeles, California. The company was founded by Rob Herting in 2018 as a partnership between the production company Automatik and the management firm Grandview. The company focuses on producing scripted, narrative podcasts.

History
QCode was founded in 2018 by Rob Herting, a former agent at the Creative Arts Agency. The network was founded as a partnership, with Automatik as the production company and Grandview as the management firm. Sandra Yee Ling, previously an executive producer at Automatik, is the vice president of production at QCode. The company's head of music is pianist and composer Deron Johnson. Michele Zárate, formerly of Sonar Entertainment, is the director of development, and Tess Ryan is one of the company's producers. Steve Wilson, formerly from Apple, is the company's chief strategy officer. David Henning is also on staff.

In 2020 QCode raised $6.4 million in funding by Sonos with participation by venture-capital firm C Ventures to scale up production to more than fifteen original podcasts every year. In 2021, QCode announced plans to launch QCode+ with Apple Inc. QCode+ will be a subscription based service that will offer twelve original shows with no ads and bonus material.

The company uses the Dolby Atmos audio standard, which was not supported yet by most podcast apps in 2021. The company also uses binaural recordings to create 3D audio effects, which is becoming increasingly popular among podcast networks like iHeartMedia or the Paragon Collective. Madeline Wells of SFGate, discussed the company's use of surround sound in their podcast The Left Right Game saying that "the sound is so good — don’t listen to this while driving or the jump-scares could get dangerous," and that the sound production creates a "riveting companion" when going on walks. Similarly, Andrew Liptak of The Verge cautioned against driving a car while listening to Carrier because the surround sound can be overwhelming at times and some sound effects—such as a truck honking its horn—can be alarming if operating a vehicle.

The company launched its first podcast—Blackout—in 2019, which starred Rami Malek. Herting's goal is to create new stories in the podcasting medium that have not been done in film or television. The actors and producers at QCode have a history of working in film and television, and the podcasts created by the company could easily be adapted into films or television series. Miranda Sawyer of The Guardian, noted that—in contrast to small indie productions—well funded audio production companies like QCode have a history of "making queer relationships straight, and (you guessed it) employing big Hollywood celebrities as actors." Rashika Rao of Radio Drama Revival had a similar complaint after listening to The Left Right Game saying, "I think a fundamental misunderstanding is that podcasting is TV lite." Rao went on to address the fact that large audio production companies like QCode have chosen to hire from the film and television industry rather than support independent podcasts that might have better ideas.

Shows

Awards

References

External links 

Companies based in Los Angeles
American companies established in 2019
Podcasting companies